Felley is a civil parish in the Ashfield district, in Nottinghamshire, England, located between Hucknall and Sutton-in-Ashfield. According to the 2001 census, the parish had a population of four. At the 2011 Census the population remained minimal. Details are included in the Underwood ward of Ashfield Council. Prior to 1974 it was part of Basford Rural District.

The parish is grouped with the neighbouring parish of Annesley (pop 1,096) to elect a joint parish council.

History 
The name "Felley" means 'Wood/clearing with ploughed land'. Throughout its history the hamlet of Felley has been overshadowed by the Augustinian priory, Felley Priory. Therefore, few records of the secular settlement exist. Felley was an extra-parochial area, it became a civil parish in 1858.

References

Other sources
Nottinghamshire History – Felley Priory
Nottinghamshire History – Felley and its priory

External links
 Annesley and Felley Parish Council

Civil parishes in Nottinghamshire
Ashfield District